Captain Sir Alexander Fuller-Acland-Hood, 3rd Baronet (20 April 1819 – 29 April 1892) was an English Conservative Party politician, landowner and farmer.

Alexander Bateman Periam Hood was born on 20 April 1819 in Bath, Somerset, England, the son of Sir Alexander Hood, 2nd Baronet and Amelia Anne Hood (née Bateman), he was educated at the Rugby School. After he married Isabel Harriet Acland in 1849 he had the surnames Fuller Acland added to his name by royal licence. Acland-Hood was chairman of the West Somerset Railway Company and a member of the Somerset County Council.

Acland-Hood was commissioned as a Captain in the Royal Horse Guards. He was High Sheriff of Somerset in 1858 and was a Member of Parliament (MP) for Somerset West from 1859 to 1868.

Acland-Hood died at the family home at St Audries House, West Quantoxhead, Somerset on 29 April 1892 of Pneumonia, aged 73. He and Isabel had nine children. The eldest, Alexander succeeded to the Baronetcy.

References

1819 births
1892 deaths
Royal Horse Guards officers
High Sheriffs of Somerset
People educated at Rugby School
People from Bath, Somerset
Councillors in Somerset
Conservative Party (UK) MPs for English constituencies
UK MPs 1859–1865
UK MPs 1865–1868
Baronets in the Baronetage of the United Kingdom
Alexander